Richard Smyth or Smythe may refer to:
Richard Smyth (theologian) (1499/1500–1563), Regius Professor of Divinity at the University of Oxford
Richard Smyth (minister) (1826–1878), minister of the Presbyterian Church in Ireland and politician
Richard Smyth (cricketer, born 1950), English cricketer
Richard Smyth (cricketer, born 1951), English school headmaster and cricketer
Richie Smyth, director of the advertisement Anticipation
Richard Smyth (hymnist) (1838–1914), Mormon hymn writer
Sir Richard Smythe (1563–1628), MP for Heytesbury and Hythe

See also
Richard Smith (disambiguation)
Richard, given name
Smyth, surname
Smythe (disambiguation), surname